John Beveridge (30 September 1909 – 3 May 1971) was a South African cricketer. He played in two first-class matches for Border in 1929/30.

See also
 List of Border representative cricketers

References

External links
 

1909 births
1971 deaths
South African cricketers
Border cricketers
Cricketers from Durban